Mieczysław Mackiewicz (9 May 1880 near Kaunas – 6 August 1954 in Bangor, Wales) was a Polish general.

Biography
In partitioned Poland, Mackiewicz joined the Imperial Russian Army and fought in the Russo-Japanese War (1904–1905), reaching the rank of a captain. In 1913 he secretly joined the Polish pro-independence organization Związek Strzelecki, and worked with Józef Piłsudski. During the First World War, he fought in the Russian Army against the Germans, and was captured in 1915. He formed a Polish school for NCOs in prisoner-of-war camps. In 1918 he joined the Polish Army. He took part in the Polish-Lithuanian negotiations in Suwałki and fought in the Polish-Soviet War, where he commanded infantry divisions and operational groups; He was wounded in 1920, and promoted to general in 1927. He retired in 1935, but joined the Polish Army again during German invasion of Poland in 1939 as a volunteer. Eventually he joined the Polish Armed Forces in the West. After the war he settled in the United Kingdom, where he died in 1954.

Honours and awards
 Order of Virtuti Militari
 Order of Polonia Restituta, Officer's Cross
 Cross of Independence
 Medal of Independence
 Cross of Valour – four times
 Gold Cross of Merit

1880 births
1954 deaths
Military personnel from Kaunas
Polish generals
Recipients of the Virtuti Militari
Officers of the Order of Polonia Restituta
Recipients of the Cross of Independence
Recipients of the Medal of Independence
Recipients of the Cross of Valour (Poland)
Recipients of the Gold Cross of Merit (Poland)
Polish people of World War II
Imperial Russian Army personnel